Euphoria is a Canadian trance, techno, blues and electronica music project based in Toronto, Ontario. The group has released five albums and four remix EPs, based around the musical compositions and guitar playing of Ken Ramm.

History
Euphoria was formed in 1993 by Emmy nominated guitarist and composer Ken Ramm.Their 1999 self-titled effort featured guest appearances by Geddy Lee (Rush), Roy Babbington (Soft Machine), Anne Dudley (Art of Noise), and Juliet Roberts. In 1999 the track "Delirium" from the self-titled debut release broke onto North American radio charts. "Delirium" was also used in The Ongoing History of New Music episode "Alt-Rock's Greatest Instrumentals" (Episode 422, 2003).

The album Beautiful My Child, featuring Kad Achouri, Ken Whiteley, Mont Campbell, B. J. Cole and Gayle Day, among others, was recorded in the UK and released on Six Degrees Records in 2001. It received rave reviews.

In 2006, Euphoria released their third album, Precious Time, which featured full-length vocal tracks from singers Tracy Bonham and Tina Dico, and contributions from ten other musicians, including Howard Levy, and Pete Lockett, It was also warmly received.  In 2007, EMI Music Publishing released a two-CD, "in-house", set titled Sinners and Saints. The Blue Remixes, also an "in-house" EMI Music Publishing release, was released the same year.

In 2013 the E4 collection was released by British company AWAL, containing both an instrumental and album version. The Euphoria Remix EP was released in 2016.

In 2022 Euphoria released the Deep Calls Out Remixes via BFE, The Orchard and Sony Music Entertainment. The EP features six distinctly different mixes of the song Deep Calls Out, with styles ranging from Rock to Dub, Pop, Alternative Dance, Acoustic and Ambient. Ken Ramm and vocalist Kalisa Ewing are the composers of Deep Calls Out, with the EP containing instrumental contributions from synthesizer legend Patrick Gleeson, co producer Steve Addabbo, Steven Van Zandt drummer Rich Mercurio and dublab executive director Ale Cohen. Artwork is by longtime Euphoria collaborator Christine Alicino. 

Euphoria's music has been used on several television shows, including CSI: Crime Scene Investigation, Malcolm in the Middle,Roswell, and Luck, among others. Films include The Expendables 3, Vanilla Sky and Hidalgo. Euphoria's music has also been used in several high profile advertising promotions including Apple Computer and Nissan.

Band founder, Ken Ramm, holds the registered United States and Canadian trademark in the name Euphoria, for a musical group, with the USPTO and Canadian Patent And Trademark Office.

Albums

Euphoria (1999, Six Degrees)
Delirium Remixes (EP - 1999)
Beautiful My Child (2001, Six Degrees)
Sweet Rain Remixes (EP - 2001)
Precious Time (2006, Zoë Records/Rounder)
Sinners and Saints (2007, EMI Music Publishing)
The Blue Remixes (2007, EMI Music Publishing)
E4 Instrumental (2013, BFE/The Orchard/Sony)
E4 Vocal (2013, BFE/The Orchard/Sony)
Euphoria Remix EP (2016, Folistar)
Deep Calls Out Remixes (EP - 2022, BFE/The Orchard/Sony)

Track listing

Euphoria (1999)
01. Delirium – 5:01

02. (Is This) Heaven? – 4:04

03. Sleep – 4:20

04. Wait For You – 4:59

05. Notting Hill Gate – 2:04

06. Lost On A River – 5:00

07. The Dreamer – 5:47

08. Watching The Skies – 5:15

09. Elevator To My Soul – 3:54

10. The Road – 6:20

Beautiful My Child (2001)
01. Sweet Rain – 3:22

02. Little Gem – 4:30

03. In The Pink – 3:18

04. Runaway Monday – 3:25

05. Beautiful My Child – 3:31

06. Desert Drive – 5:08

07. By The Sea – 4:12

08. Cactus – 2:20

09. Devil May Care – 4:03

10. Outside – 2:43

11. 1001 Dreams – 4:24

12. Silky Delta – 2:39

Precious Time (2006)
01. Back Against the Wall – 5:19

02. Blue – 3:34

03. Cowboys – 5:33

04. Sinners and Saints – 3:46

05. The Glendale Train – 2:29

06. Fire in the Hole – 3:18

07. Precious Time – 4:43

08. The Getaway – 5:07

09. Anyone Can Lose – 4:41

10. Forever Dust – 4:23

11. Kolkata – 3:17

12. Vapor – 10:26

e4 Vocal (2013) 
01. In My Dreams – feat Robyn Dell'Unto – 2:53

02. Keeps You Going – feat Robyn Dell'Unto – 4:01

03. Remembrance Day – feat Robyn Dell'Unto – 3:18

04. Drift With Me – feat Robyn Dell'Unto – 3:19

05. Sway Song – feat Robyn Dell'Unto – 3:23

06. N'Awlins [The Lumber River Chronicles] – feat Robyn Dell'Unto – 3:29

07. Black Magic – feat Kalisa Ewing – 4:28

e4 Instrumental (2013) 
01. Keeps You Going – 4:01

02. Dream 1 – 1:15

03  A Whisper In The Wind – 4:18

04. Dream 2 – 1:09

05. Incarcerated – 4:28

06. Dream 3 – 1:31

07. Anne's House – 4:00

08. Dream 4 – 1:25

09. Remembrance Day – 3:10

10. Dream 5 – 1:17

11. Have To Yell – 5:07

12. Dream 6 – :16

13. Telephone – 4:34

Euphoria Remix EP (2016) 
01. Sinners and Saints (Still Life Remix) – feat Tina Dico – 4:07

02. Sinners and Saints (Tunabeats Tasty Remix) – feat Tina Dico – 4:58

03. Blue (Blue Bombay Mix) – feat Tina Dico – 4:13

Deep Calls Out Remixes EP (2022) 
01. Deep Calls Out (Album Mix) – 4:23

02. Deep Calls Out (Smooth Mix) – 4:16

03. Deep Calls Out (Café Ale Remix) – 4:17

04. Deep Calls Out (Acoustic Mix) – 4:27

05. Deep Calls Out (Dub Mix) – 4:27

06. Deep Calls Out (Ambient Mix) – 4:11

References

External links
Euphoria homepage
Euphoria on SoundCloud
[ AMG profile]
Ale w/ guest Ken Ramm - Elevation Through Sound
Euphoria USPTO Trademark Link
Ken Ramm - "In His Own Words" on Dublab
Euphoria - Ken Ramm - "Sizzle Reel"

Musical groups established in 1993
Musical groups from Toronto
Canadian electronic music groups
1993 establishments in Ontario
Six Degrees Records artists
Rounder Records artists